Alex Brown (12 May 1905 – 31 December 1986) was a Scotland international rugby union player. He became the 85th President of the Scottish Rugby Union.

Rugby Union career

Amateur career

Brown played for Heriots.

Provincial career

He was capped by Edinburgh District to play in the 1928 inter-city match.

International career

He played for Scotland 3 times in the period 1928 to 1929.

Administrative career

He became the 85th President of the Scottish Rugby Union. He served the standard one year from 1971 to 1972.

References

1905 births
1986 deaths
Rugby union players from Edinburgh
Scottish rugby union players
Scotland international rugby union players
Presidents of the Scottish Rugby Union
Heriot's RC players
Edinburgh District (rugby union) players
Rugby union fly-halves